Prajñāvarman (Tibetan: shes rab go cha) within early medieval literature, was an 8th-century Buddhist writer. He lived during the reigns of the Pala king, Gopala I and the Tibetan emperor Trisong Detsen, under whose auspices he came to Tibet. He was a contemporary of Jinamitra.

Prajñāvarman contributed to the translation of 77 Buddhist works from Sanskrit into Tibetan and is the author of three commentaries preserved in the Tengyur, namely the Devātiśāyastotraṭīkā, the Udānavargavivara, and the Viśeṣastavaṭikā a commentary on Udbhaṭasiddhasvāmin's Viśeṣastava. The Viśeṣastavaṭikā was translated into Tibetan by Rin-chen-bzang-po (958-1055) and Janārdhana. The Sanskrit original is now lost.

Among his translations is the Abhayapradā-nāma-aparājita co-translated with Ye shes sde (published as Tôh. no. 708 and no. 928). Derge Kanjur, vol. TSA, folios 176v.1-177v.6.)

References

Indian Buddhists
8th-century Indian writers
Buddhist translators